Edward Pery Buckley (7 November 1796 – 28 May 1873) was a British Liberal and Whig politician.

Buckley was the son of his namesake, Edward Pery Buckley, and Lady Georgiana West. He married Lady Catherine Pleydell-Bouverie, daughter of William Pleydell-Bouverie, 3rd Earl of Radnor and Lady Catherine Pelham-Clinton, in 1828, and together they had six children: Frances Gertrude (died 1921); Alfred (1829–1900); Edward William (1829–1840); Duncombe Frederick (1831–1855); Felix John (1834–1911); and Victor (1838–1882).

He was first elected Whig MP for Salisbury at a by-election in 1853—caused by the death of Charles Baring Wall–and, becoming a Liberal in 1859, held the seat until the 1865 general election, when he did not seek re-election.

Outside of his political career, Buckley also became Colonel in the 83rd (County of Dublin) Regiment of Foot.

References

External links
 

Whig (British political party) MPs for English constituencies
Liberal Party (UK) MPs for English constituencies
UK MPs 1852–1857
UK MPs 1857–1859
UK MPs 1859–1865
1796 births
1873 deaths